Winston William Wharton (May 14, 1872 – December 16, 1963) was an American football coach.  He was the first head football coach at Drake University in Des Moines, Iowa and he held that position for the 1894 season.  His coaching record at Drake was 2–2. He was a man of many talents, including baton twirling. At a church service in Tingley, Iowa a young Dan McGugin was intrigued. Wharton suggested he play football.

Head coaching record

References

External links
 

1872 births
1963 deaths
Drake Bulldogs athletic directors
Drake Bulldogs football coaches
Drake University alumni